is a former Korean province, one of the administrative divisions of Korea under Japanese rule. Its capital was Seishin. The province consisted what is now the North Korean province of North Hamgyong, as well as parts of neighboring provinces.

Population 
Number of people by nationality according to the 1936 census:

 Overall population: 813,893 people
 Japanese: 45,433 people
 Koreans: 762,071 people
 Other: 6,389 people

Administrative divisions

Cities 

 Seishin (capital)
 Rashin
 Jōshin

Counties 

Kakujō
Kisshū
Meisen
Kyōjō
Funei
Mozan
Kainei
Onjō
Keigen
Keikō

See also
Provinces of Korea
Governor-General of Chōsen
Administrative divisions of Korea

References

Korea under Japanese rule
Former prefectures of Japan in Korea